Nachar-e Pain (also Romanized as Nāchār-e Pā’īn; also known as Nāchār and Rangīnū) is a village in Asir Rural District, Asir District, Mohr County, Fars Province, Iran. At the 2006 census, its population was 30, in 6 families.

References 

Populated places in Mohr County